Hugo Pigeon (born 15 September 1996 in Avignon) is a French cyclist, who specializes in mountain biking.

Major results
2013
 2nd Cross-country, National Junior Mountain Bike Championships
2014
 1st  Mixed team relay, UCI Mountain Bike & Trials World Championships
 1st  Mixed team relay, UEC European Mountain Bike Championships
 1st  Cross-country, National Junior Mountain Bike Championships
 2nd National Junior Cyclo-cross Championships

References

External links
Profile on MTBCrossCountry.com

1996 births
Living people
French male cyclists
Sportspeople from Avignon
Cyclists from Provence-Alpes-Côte d'Azur